Squadron Leader Cecil Thomas Nixon Moore  was a Royal Air Force officer. 

He was educated at Bloxham School. He served in the ranks of the RAF during the Second World War, and was promoted to corporal in 1942. He commissioned into the Royal Air Force Regiment in 1948. He saw active service in the Korean War and was awarded the Distinguished Flying Cross. He was invested as a Member of the Order of the British Empire on 1 June 1953 in the 1953 Coronation Honours. His period of service was extended on 25 May 1954. He became Squadron Leader in 1955 and took command of No. 2603 (City of Edinburgh) Light Anti-Aircraft Squadron. He received a permanent commission in the Secretarial Branch of the RAF on 20 April 1956. He relinquished his commission on 26 April 1966.

References

Date of birth unknown
Date of death unknown
Graduates of the Royal Air Force College Cranwell
Members of the Order of the British Empire
People educated at Bloxham School
Recipients of the Distinguished Flying Cross (United Kingdom)
Royal Air Force officers
Royal Air Force Regiment officers